Anu Sinisalo (born 3 March 1966) is a Finnish actress. She has acted in drama television series as well as in films.

She won Best Actress of the year at the annual Finnish Golden Venla TV awards for her role in TV drama Bordertown as Detective Constable Lena Jaakkola.

Partial filmography

Film 
  (1998)
  (1999)
  (2001)
  (2002)
 Reunion 2: The Bachelor Party (2016)
 Finders of the Lost Yacht (2021)

Television 
  (1995)
 Rapman (1995)
  (1995–1997)
 Rakkauden tanssi (1998)
  (1998)
  (1998–1999)
  (2001–2003)
  (2002)
 Operation Stella Polaris (2003)
 Akkaa päälle (2006)
  (2006)
 Salatut elämät (2006) – Anna-Maija Halonen
  (Helppo elämä, 2009–2011)
 Bordertown (Sorjonen, 2018–2019) – Lena Jaakkola

References

External links 
 

1966 births
Finnish television actresses
Living people
Finnish film actresses
20th-century Finnish actresses
21st-century Finnish actresses